During the 2007–08 season, Associazione Calcio Milan played its 74th Serie A season in the club's existence. Milan competed in Serie A, finishing fifth and failing to qualify for the UEFA Champions League for the first time since 2001–02, as well as in the Coppa Italia and the UEFA Champions League, being knocked out in the round of 16 in both competitions. As winners of the 2006–07 UEFA Champions League Milan competed in the UEFA Super Cup and the FIFA Club World Cup, winning both competitions.

Club

Management

Other information

Players

Squad information

As of 1 March 2008.

Transfers

Winter

Pre-season and friendlies

Competitions

Overall

Serie A

League table

Results summary

Results by round

Matches

Coppa Italia

Round of 16

UEFA Champions League

Group stage

Knockout phase

Round of 16

UEFA Super Cup

FIFA Club World Cup

Statistics

Appearances and goals

Goalscorers

Goals conceded

Discipline

References

Sources

 

A.C. Milan seasons
Milan
FIFA Club World Cup-winning seasons